Ban Dara Junction is a railway station located in Phichai District, Uttaradit. It is a Class 3 Station and serves as a junction for the Sawankhalok Branch. It is also the nearest station to Poramin Railway Bridge.

History
Ban Dara Junction was the first railway junction on the Northern Line, with the branch to Sawankhalok railway station. The name comes together with the subdistrict itself. King Chulalongkorn used the railway to visit this junction and found out that this village had no name. Therefore, he decided to name this place Dara. So forth, the station's name is Ban Dara until this day.

Train services
 Rapid 105/106 Bangkok–Sila At–Bangkok
 Local 403/404 Phitsanulok–Sila At–Phitsanulok
 Local 407/408 Nakhon Sawan–Chiang Mai–Nakhon Sawan
 Special Express 3/4 Bangkok–Sawankhalok/Sila At–Bangkok
 Rapid 111/112 Bangkok–Den Chai–Bangkok
 Rapid 109 Bangkok–Chiang Mai
 Rapid 102 Chiang Mai–Bangkok

References
 
 

Railway stations in Thailand